Poecilasthena schistaria, the kanuka looper, is a moth in the family Geometridae. It is found in New Zealand.

The wings vary from very pale brown to rather dull purplish-brown with numerous jagged, darker transverse lines. Adults are on wing from October to April.

The larvae feed on Leptospermum scoparium. They are dull green with a white more or less black-edged band down each side. There is a thin central white line on the back, and a narrow yellow line half-way between it and the lateral white band. The head is dull green. Pupation takes place in a slight cocoon below the surface of the earth.

References

Moths described in 1861
Poecilasthena
Moths of New Zealand
Endemic fauna of New Zealand
Taxa named by Francis Walker (entomologist)
Endemic moths of New Zealand